Earl Liburd (born March 24, 1954) is a boxer who represents the United States Virgin Islands. He competed in the men's light middleweight event at the 1976 Summer Olympics.

References

1954 births
Living people
United States Virgin Islands male boxers
Olympic boxers of the United States Virgin Islands
Boxers at the 1976 Summer Olympics
Place of birth missing (living people)
Light-middleweight boxers